Movimento (English: "Movement") is the sixth studio album by Portuguese group Madredeus. It was released on 9 April 2001 by EMI-Valentim de Carvalho.

Recording 
Movimento was recorded in January and February 2000 at the Wisseloord Studios in Hilversum, Netherlands. The mixing was done at the Êxito Estúdio in Lisbon, Portugal, in April 2000.

Track listing

Personnel 
Credits are adapted from the album's inner notes.

Madredeus

 Teresa Salgueiro – voice
 Pedro Ayres Magalhães – classic guitar
 José Peixoto – classic guitar
 Carlos Maria Trindade – synthesizers
 Fernando Júdice – acoustic bass

Production

 Pedro Ayres Magalhães – production, musical direction, cover project
 Jorge Barata – sound engineer
 António Pinheiro da Silva – sound engineer
 Hessel Hélder – assistant at Wisseloord Studios
 Paulo Trindade – assistant at Êxito Estúdio
 Luís Delgado – assistant at Estúdio Tcha Tcha Tcha (pre-production)
 Paulo Jorge Ferreira – mastering
 Paulo Junqueiro – executive production
 Helena Evangelista – executive production
 Daniel Blaufuks – photography
 António Cunha – management
 Paulo Nery – management
 Maria Forjaz – management

Charts

References 

Madredeus albums
EMI Records albums
2001 albums